Waterloo South was a federal electoral district and a provincial electoral district in Canada.

Federally, it was represented in the House of Commons of Canada from 1867 to 1968. It was located in the province of Ontario. It was created by the British North America Act of 1867 using an 1859 definition of the "South Riding of Waterloo", which consisted of the Town of Galt and the Villages of Preston, New Hamburg, and Hespeler, as well as the Townships of South Waterloo, North Dumfries and Wilmot.

In 1903, it was redefined to consist of the townships of North Dumfries, South Waterloo and Wilmot, and the towns of Ayr, Galt, Hespeler, New Hamburg and Preston. Beginning in 1924, the riding was called "Waterloo South".

The electoral district was abolished in 1966 when it was redistributed between Kitchener, Perth and Waterloo ridings.

The Waterloo South provincial electoral district was represented in the Ontario legislature from 1867 until 1975.

Members of Parliament

Members of Provincial Parliament

Electoral history

Federal

See also 

 List of Canadian federal electoral districts
 Past Canadian electoral districts

External links 

 Parliament of Canada

Former federal electoral districts of Ontario
Former provincial electoral districts of Ontario